Events in the year 2021 in Liberia.

Incumbents 

 President: George Weah
 Vice President: Jewel Taylor
 Chief Justice: Francis S. Korkpor, Sr.

Events 

January 1 – The Faith Community Lutheran Church in the United States of America has selected Gbarnga, Bong County to host the second Lutheran University in Africa.
January 7 – President George Weah attends the second inauguration of Ghanaian President Nana Akufo-Addo.
January 20 – President Joe Biden sends a memorandum to the United States Department of State reinstating Deferred Enforced Departure (DED) to Liberians.
January 22 – United States Ambassador Michael A. McCarthy presents his credentials to President Weah.
April 1 – The results of the 2020 Liberian constitutional referendum are released. Voters reject efforts to shorten the president′s term and to allow dual citizenship.
 July 26 – University of Liberia President Dr. Julius S. Nelson Jr. serves as national Independence Day orator.

Scheduled events

March 10 – Decoration Day.
March 15 – Joseph Jenkins Roberts Birthday.
July 26 – Independence Day.

Deaths
 May 28  – Emma Shannon Walser, first female circuit judge in Liberia (b. 1929)
 July 9 – Wesley Momo Johnson, Vice-Chairman of the National Transitional Government of Liberia (2003–2006), ambassador, and Olympian, in Montserrado County (b. 1944)
 November 8 – Willis Forko, Liberian-born American professional footballer (b. 1983)

See also

COVID-19 pandemic in Africa
Foreign relations of Liberia

References 

 
2020s in Liberia
Years of the 21st century in Liberia
Liberia
Liberia